Traffic Zone may refer to:

 Traffic analysis zone, a unit of geography most commonly used in conventional transportation planning models
 Traffic Zone Center for Visual Art, a Minneapolis-based artist cooperative